This list of tallest buildings in Panvel ranks skyscrapers and high-rise buildings in Panvel based on official height. Panvel (Marathi pronunciation: [pənʋeːl]) is a Municipal Corporation and Taluka in Raigad district of Maharashtra, India. It is highly populated due to its closeness to Mumbai. Panvel is also governed for development purpose by the body of Mumbai Metropolitan Region. Panvel Municipal Corporation is the first Municipal Corporation in Raigad and the 27th Municipal corporation of Maharashtra.

Tallest buildings 
This includes spires and architectural details but does not include antenna masts. Only completed buildings, under-construction buildings and on-hold buildings that have topped out are included.

Upcoming projects 

See also 

 List of tallest buildings in India
 List of tallest buildings in Mumbai
 List of tallest buildings in Pune
 List of tallest buildings in Bangalore
 List of tallest buildings in different cities in India

References

Navi Mumbai
Buildings and structures in Navi Mumbai
Navi Mumbai-related lists
Lists of buildings and structures in Maharashtra